Luis Mateo Díez (born 21 September 1942) is a Spanish writer. He has written widely in a variety of genres, and has published over 50 books till date. He is best known for his works that focus on the fictional Kingdom of Celama (e.g. El espíritu del páramo, La ruina del cielo and El oscurecer). Two of his novels have won both the Premio de la Crítica and the Premio Nacional de Narrativa - La fuente de la edad in 1986, and La ruina del cielo in 2000. Díez also won the National Prize for Spanish Literature in 2020.

References

Spanish literature
Spanish male writers
Spanish writers
20th-century Spanish male writers
21st-century Spanish male writers
1942 births
Living people